Murphy Hill is a mountain located in the Catskill Mountains of New York southwest of Andes. Hemlock Knoll is located northeast, and Bryden Hill is located west of Hemlock Knoll.

References

Mountains of Delaware County, New York
Mountains of New York (state)